Tessie Savelkouls (born 11 March 1992) is a Dutch retired judoka.
She was born in Appeltern in the Netherlands.  She competed at the 2016 Summer Olympics in Rio de Janeiro, in the women's +78 kg. She also competed in the women's +78 kg event at the 2020 Summer Olympics in Tokyo, Japan.

She is openly lesbian.

References

External links

1992 births
Living people
Dutch female judoka
Olympic judoka of the Netherlands
Judoka at the 2016 Summer Olympics
European Games competitors for the Netherlands
Judoka at the 2015 European Games
Judoka at the 2020 Summer Olympics
Dutch LGBT sportspeople
21st-century Dutch women